She's Back is a studio album by American singer Dionne Warwick. It was released by Kind Music and eOne Entertainment on May 17, 2019. Chiefly produced by her son Damon Elliott along with Teddy Harmon, initial editions of She's Back contained a remastered version of Warwick's 1998 album Dionne Sings Dionne as a bonus disc. It debuted and peaked at number 19 on the US Independent Albums.

Critical reception

Stephen Thomas Erlewine from Allmusic wrote that Warwick's son and chief producer Damon Elliott "paints She's Back with all manners of modern flair: the rhythms are electronic, the instruments largely synthesized, and the bass is often cranked. Several vocalists are invited to help broaden Warwick's appeal, too. Her duet partners are relatively old-fashioned (Kenny Lattimore, Brian McKnight), relatively hip (Musiq Soulchild), and certainly surprising (Krayzie Bone, whose verse on "Déjà Vu" is disarming), and they all help nudge She's Back into the 21st century, even if the overall aesthetic remains lodged in the 20th century [...] Since the album relies so heavily on ballads and slow jams, it becomes apparent that Warwick's voice isn't as supple as it once was, a transition that is inevitable with age, but the songs and settings of She's Back cast this human deficit in an unfortunately harsh light."

Track listing 

Notes
  denotes vocals producer

Charts

Release history

References 

Dionne Warwick albums
2019 albums